Bacteriovoracaceae is a family of gram-negative, comma-shaped bacteria. All members have a two-part life cycle consisting of a free-living motile "attack phase" and a "predatory phase" that lives in the periplasm of other gram-negative bacteria. Bacteriovoracaceae are found in freshwater and in the soil.

Phylogeny
The currently accepted taxonomy is based on the List of Prokaryotic names with Standing in Nomenclature (LPSN) and National Center for Biotechnology Information (NCBI)

See also
 List of bacterial orders
 List of bacteria genera

References

Oligoflexia